Günther Förg (December 5, 1952 – December 5, 2013) was a German painter, graphic designer, sculptor and photographer. His abstract style was influenced by American abstract painting.

Life
Förg was born in Füssen, Allgäu. His father, Michael, worked in a customs office. He studied from 1973 until 1979 at the Academy of Fine Arts in Munich with Karl Fred Dahmen.  From 1992 until 1999, he taught at the Staatliche Hochschule für Gestaltung in Karlsruhe. From 1999 on he was a professor in Munich. He had a home in Areuse, Switzerland, as well as in Freiburg. In 1993 he married Ika Huber.

Work

Förg's artistic oeuvre encompasses paintings, graphic and sculptural works as well as a great body of architectural photographs. His geometrical, abstract, and heavily dyed pictures have a strong decorative character. Förg combined materials and media in painting, sculpture and photography. The themes of his large scale architectural photographs are Bauhaus and fascist aesthetics, while his monochrome wall paintings and lead paintings are reflections on art.

Between 1973 (Förg's first year as a student at The Academy of Fine Art Munich) and 1976, Förg painted almost exclusively black monochrome canvas pictures in acrylic, which, with the addition of a translucent grey, produced a milky, veiled surface effect. After the death of his artistic colleague, Blinky Palermo, Förg pursued the latter's European legacy of American Minimal Art from 1977. Palermo has been quoted as saying, in reference to Förg, “the art is near as beautiful as the man”. It is unclear whether this was meant as an insult of compliment. His paintings in abstract styles recall Cy Twombly, Ellsworth Kelly and others.

In the early 1980s, Förg made his so-called Alubilder – assemblages of aluminium sheeting onto which the artist had painted linear patterns or portrait photographs. For his series of paintings on lead, dating from the 1980s and 1990s, he wrapped lead sheets over wood, then painted each surface with acrylic.

Förg started using photography in his work at the beginning of the 1980s. In the area of photography he is known for his works from 1980–2006, primarily very large formats showing famous architectural sites such as the Wittgenstein House, Casa Malaparte, Casa del Fascio, and Hans Poelzig’s IG Farben Building in Frankfurt. For this purpose he travelled extensively to Spain, Israel, Austria, Russia, France, Turkey and Italy where he primarily photographed Bauhaus buildings. Förg's photographic research using a 35 mm camera and zoom lenses presents the uncompromisingly modern architecture in an unembellished way, sometimes dilapidated, often featuring careless renovations or additions. His photographs of buildings with cultural and political significance — Bauhaus structures in Tel Aviv and Jerusalem, for example, or Fascist ones in Italy — were taken from unusual, sharp-angled perspectives, with off-center framing and often in grainy focus, suggestive of painting. Many of the photographs are views taken through windows that draw attention to transitions from interior to exterior space. The photographs are presented under thick protective glass reflecting the room and the viewer.

In 1988, as part of the Sculpture in the City exhibition, Förg installed two-metre-long walls of mirrors in a Rotterdam tube station; they were demolished in 1999.

Beginning in 1992, paintings and works on paper, known and documented in literature as "Gitterbilder" (grid paintings), appear in Förg's work. The roots for these pieces, however, are to be found in an earlier series, the so-called "Fenster-Aquarelle" (window watercolors): the crossbar forms a grid for the space in the image, which provides the frame for a whole flow of paintings without limiting their free display and development.

In 1991 for the opening of Frankfurt's Museum für Moderne Kunst, Förg produced a colorful wall piece for the central stairway, which together with a bronze relief formed a contrast to the architectural structure of the post-modern museum architecture. In 2000, he was commissioned with designs for Swiss Re's Centre for Global Dialogue in Zurich.  For this project Forg handled the color design for all of the interiors in the 1920s Villa Bodmer and installed two enormous tubes of raw metal in its central entrance hall.

He died, aged 61, in Colombier, Neuchâtel, Switzerland.

Exhibitions
Förg had his first solo exhibition at Rüdiger Schöttle Gallery, Munich, in 1980 with a series of monochrome paintings. In 1992, his work could be seen at the documenta IX, followed by an exhibition at the Stedelijk Museum in Amsterdam in 1995. Förg has had solo exhibitions at Essl Museum, Klosterneuburg, Austria, Langen Foundation, Neuss, Germany, Kunstmuseum Basel, Switzerland; Kunsthalle Bremen, Germany; Gemeentemuseum Den Haag, The Netherlands; Tel Aviv Museum of Art, Tel Aviv, Kunsthaus Bregenz, Bregenz, Austria, Museum der Stadt Füssen, Füssen, Germany, and Deutsche Guggenheim, Berlin, Germany.

One-person exhibitions (selection) 
 1982: Galerie Achim Kubinski, Stuttgart
 1983: Galerie Max Hetzler, Stuttgart
 1991: Kunsthalle Tübingen: Günther Förg, 10. August - 15. September 1991
 2003: Patrick De Brock Gallery, Knokke, Belgium
 2005: Max Dudler, Günther Förg, Architektur Galerie, Berlin 
 2006: Günther Förg – Raum und Fläche – Fotografien, Kunsthalle Bremen
 2007: Museum für Gegenwartskunst, Basel
 2007: Museum der Stadt Füssen, Füssen
 2007: Patrick De Brock Gallery, Knokke, Belgium
 2008: Günther Förg – BACK AND FORTH, Essl Museum – Kunst der Gegenwart, Klosterneuburg/Wien, Katalog Essl Museum
 2009: Fondation Beyeler, Riehen
 2010: Günther Förg – Wandmalerei und Fotografie, Galerie Vera Munro, Hamburg
 2010: Patrick De Brock Gallery, Knokke, Belgium
 2011: Günther Förg – Bilder, Wandmalereien und Fotografie 1987–2011, Galerie Max Hetzler, Berlin
 2014: Günther Förg., Museum Brandhorst, München
 2016: FÖRG - Günther Förg aus der Sammlung Kopp München, MEWO Kunsthalle, Memmingen

Art market
During his lifetime, Förg’s work was shown by Greene Naftali Gallery in New York; Almine Rech Gallery in New York, London, Paris, and Brussels; and Galerie Max Hetzler in Berlin. Since 2018, his estate has been exclusively represented by Hauser & Wirth.

Recognition
In 1996, Förg was awarded the Wolfgang Hahn Prize. He is mentioned in "Art Now vol. 3 ", (Taschen Verlag, 2009) as being amongst the most interesting living contemporary artists. According to Artinvestor Magazine (2009), Förg ranked 23rd globally amongst then living artists when several factors are combined, such as collections, auction results and gallery representation.

Gallery

Important public collections

Germany
Pinakothek der Moderne, Munich
Lenbachhaus, Munich
Daimler Contemporary, Berlin
Hamburger Bahnhof - Museum für Gegenwart, Berlin
Sammlung Haubrok, Berlin
Sammlung Hoffmann, Berlin
Kunstmuseum Bonn, Bonn
Kunstsammlungen Chemnitz, Chemnitz
MKM Museum Küppersmühle für Moderne Kunst, Duisburg
Kunstpalais Erlangen, Erlangen
Kunstsammlung Deutsche Bundesbank, Frankfurt am Main
Museum für Moderne Kunst (MMK), Frankfurt am Main
Städel, Frankfurt/Main
Zentrum für Kunst und Medientechnologie, Karlsruhe
Museum Kurhaus Kleve
Museum Ludwig, Cologne
Galerie für Zeitgenössische Kunst GfZK, Leipzig
Städtisches Museum Abteiberg, Mönchengladbach
Kunstraum Grässlin, St. Georgen
Städtische Galerie Wolfsburg

Austria
Essl Museum, Klosterneuburg/Vienna

Canada
AGO, Toronto
National Gallery of Canada, Ottawa

The Netherlands
Stedelijk Museum, Amsterdam

Switzerland
Swiss Re, Zurich

United Kingdom
Tate Modern, London

United States
National Gallery of Art, Washington D.C.
Art Institute of Chicago, Chicago, IL
MOCA, Los Angeles, CA
Museum of Modern Art, New York, NY
Walker Art Center, Minneapolis, MN
Mildred Lane Kemper Art Museum, Saint Louis, MO
San Francisco Museum of Modern Art, San Francisco, CA
J. Paul Getty Museum, Los Angeles, CA
High Museum of Art, Atlanta, GA
The Broad Art Foundation, Santa Monica, CA

Scandinavia
Louisiana Museum of Modern Art, Humlebæk, Denmark
Arken Museum of Modern Art, Ishøj, Denmark

See also
 List of German painters

References

External links

60jahre-60werke.de
Günther Förg on Artcyclopedia
Günther Förg at Galerie Lelong (French representing gallery)

1952 births
2013 deaths
20th-century German painters
German male painters
21st-century German painters
Academy of Fine Arts, Munich alumni
German male sculptors
20th-century German sculptors
20th-century German male artists
21st-century German sculptors
21st-century German male artists
German watercolourists
German contemporary artists